Eugene Clark or Gene Clark may refer to:

 Eugene Clark (politician) (1850–1932), Wisconsin politician
 Eugene Clark (rower) (1906–1981), American Olympic rower
 Eugene Clark (actor) (born 1951), American actor and professional football player
 Eugene F. Clark (c. 1911–1998), United States Navy officer
 Eugene V. Clark (1926–2012), Catholic priest
 Gene Clark (1944–1991), American singer-songwriter
 Torchy Clark (Eugene Clark, 1929–2009), first basketball coach at the University of Central Florida
 Eugene B. Clark (1874–1942), founder of Clark Equipment Company
 Gene Clark, 1968 California political candidate
 Gene Clark, grandson of Chief Geronimo, see Buffalo Ranch
 "Gene Clark", a song by Teenage Fanclub from their 1993 album Thirteen

See also
 Eugenie Clark (1922–2015), American ichthyologist sometimes called "The Shark Lady"